Dancesport has been part of the World Games since the 1997 edition. Among the disciplines are Standard, Latin, Salsa and Rock'n'Roll.

Medalists

Standard

Latin

Rock'n'Roll

Salsa

 
World Games
Sports at the World Games